Layton is a city on the island of Long Key in Monroe County, Florida, United States. The population was 210 at the 2020 census.

History
In the late 19th century, Long Key was used as a coconut plantation. By 1910, Layton was becoming famous as a fishing destination, thanks in part to promotion by sports writer Zane Grey. However, the developing tourist infrastructure on Long Key, including a station on the Overseas Railroad, was largely destroyed by the Labor Day Hurricane of 1935.

After World War II, Mary and Del Layton (born 1906), who ran a grocery business in Miami, bought  on Long Key and started developing the property as "Layton's Long Key Fishing Camp", which grew substantially over the succeeding years.

Layton was incorporated as a town on September 18, 1963. The land that would become Long Key State Park was acquired between 1961 and 1973; the park opened on October 1, 1969.

Geography

Demographics

As of the census of 2000, there were 186 people, 84 households, and 50 families living in the city. The racial makeup of the city was 98.92% White, 0.54% African American and 0.54% Asian. Hispanic or Latino of any race were 2.15% of the population.

There were 84 households, out of which 15.5% had children under the age of 18 living with them, 56.0% were married couples living together, 1.2% had a female householder with no husband present, and 39.3% were non-families. 22.6% of all households were made up of individuals, and 4.8% had someone living alone who was 65 years of age or older.  The average household size was 2.21 and the average family size was 2.61.

In the city, the population was spread out, with 11.3% under the age of 18, 7.5% from 18 to 24, 23.1% from 25 to 44, 39.8% from 45 to 64, and 18.3% who were 65 years of age or older.  The median age was 51 years. For every 100 females, there were 95.8 males.  For every 100 females age 18 and over, there were 98.8 males.

The median income for a household in the city was $53,750, and the median income for a family was $73,750. Males had a median income of $29,896 versus $23,125 for females. The per capita income for the city was $23,773.  About 11.7% of families and 15.4% of the population were below the poverty line, including none of those under the age of eighteen and 21.4% of those 65 or over.

Languages
As of 2000, English as a first language accounted for 90.68%, while Spanish as a mother tongue made up 9.31% of the population.

Education
It is in the Monroe County School District. It is zoned to Plantation Key School (K-8).

References

External links
 
 History of Long Key
 Goshen College marine lab at Layton

Cities in Monroe County, Florida
Cities in Florida
Populated coastal places in Florida on the Atlantic Ocean